Teenage Mailbag is an Australian television series which aired in 1960 on Sydney station TCN-9. It was a panel discussion series on teenage issues. Roger Climpson was the host. Teenagers would send in letters with problems and questions which would be discussed by a panel of three, with June Dally-Watkins and John O'Grady being the regular panellists, along with a guest panellist.

It should not be confused with the 1957-1958 Melbourne-aired series Teenage Mailbag, which was a 15-minute music series.

Reception
Australian Women's Weekly called the series "a well-rounded, entertaining show".

See also
Leave it to the Girls

References

External links
Teenage Mailbag on IMDb

1960 Australian television series debuts
1960 Australian television series endings
Black-and-white Australian television shows
English-language television shows
Australian television talk shows